Imaan Sulaiman-Ibrahim, is a Nigerian politician and businesswoman. She was the director-general of National Agency for the Prohibition of Trafficking in Persons, NAPTIP from 1 December 2020 till 27 May 2021, when the Nigerian President, Muhammadu Buhari announced a swap and she was redeployed as the Honourable Federal Commissioner of the National Commission for Refugees, Migrants, and Internally Displaced Persons.

Early life and education 
Sulaiman-Ibrahim was raised in Abuja, Nigeria. She attended Aruwa Nursery School, Abuja and Jabi Primary School, (now, LEA Primary School, Jabi), for her nursery and primary school education before preceding to Federal Government Girls College, Bwari, Abuja for her secondary education. At the age of 19, she graduated from University of Abuja with a degree in sociology. At the age of 21, she received two master's degrees from Webster University, an MBA and MA. She did her mandatory National Youth Service Corps at NNPC, Kaduna zonal office.

Career 
Imaan Sulaiman-Ibrahim started her career working at Abuja Geographic Information Systems, AGIS, before moving to the United Kingdom where she worked in human resource,Business and Management before becoming a certified [SAP] [Human resource management|HCM]] consultant. Sulaiman-Ibrahim joined Mary Kay and later became a senior sales director. She was a special adviser on strategic communication to the minister of state for education, Chukwuemeka Nwajiuba and she was appointed a member of the Nasarawa State economic advisory council by the Executive Governor of Nassarawa State Engr. A. A. Sule in September 2019. She was recently the Director-General of the National Agency for the Prohibition of Trafficking in persons for the duration of 6 months from December 2020 to May 2021. Currently, she is the Honourable Federal Commissioner of the National Commission For Refugees Migrants And Internally Displaced Persons Office as of June 4, 2021.

Director-General of NAPTIP 
On 1 December 2020, Imaan Sulaiman-Ibrahim was appointed by the president of Nigeria, Muhammadu Buhari as the director-general of National Agency for the Prohibition of Trafficking in Persons, NAPTIP for a four-year tenure to replace Julie Okah-Donli. She served as the Director-General of NAPTIP for the duration of 6 months from December 2020 to May 20211, following the directives of President Muhammadu Buhari to move to the National Commission For Refugees Migrants And Internally Displaced Persons Office as the Honourable Federal Commissioner.

Personal life 
Sulaiman-Ibrahim was born in Jos, Plateau State, Nigeria. She is from Keffi, Nasarawa State, Nigeria. Her father was S.K Danladi, an Abuja-based engineer and developer. Her mother is Aishatu Sulaiman Danladi, a teacher. She is the second child in a family of eight children. Sulaiman-Ibrahim is married and has three children.

References 

Living people
People from Nasarawa State
University of Abuja alumni
Webster University alumni
Nigerian women in politics
Year of birth missing (living people)